Le Touquet-Paris-Plage (older ), commonly referred to as Le Touquet, is a commune near Étaples, in the Pas-de-Calais department, northern France. It has a population of 4,227 (2019), but welcomes up to 250,000 people during the summer.

Located on the Opal Coast, south of Boulogne-sur-Mer, on the shoreline of the English Channel, the seaside resort has been nicknamed the "Garden of the English Channel", the "Pearl of the Opal Coast", the "Sports Paradise" or the "Four Seasons Resort".

The city bears the scars of wounds inflicted during World War II by the construction of the Atlantic Wall, the planting of mines prior to the German withdrawal and intensive Allied bombings. Nevertheless, part of the architectural heritage of Le Touquet was left intact. A number of unique villas have been preserved that evoke the seaside architecture of the Roaring Twenties and the 1930s. Although nowadays dominated by buildings from the 1950s to the 1980s, Le Touquet also possesses an important architectural heritage of Anglo-Norman style as well as twenty-one buildings protected as historical monuments, which make it the most awarded French seaside resort.

Geography 
Le Touquet is located on the left bank of the mouth of the Canche river on the coast of Pas-de-Calais, 23 km south of Boulogne-sur-Mer. It is in a coastal region that is frequently referred to as the 'Côte d'Opale' (the Opal Coast), a name that evokes the iridescent reflections of the setting sun on the sea.

The town looks out onto the English Channel. Its beach starts at the mouth of the Canche river in the north and extends more than 12 kilometers towards Berck in the south. It is a west-facing beach, lined with dunes and with very fine sand.

The municipal territory consists of a series of small sandy plains, including some wetlands, which are surrounded by sand dunes, some of which reach a height of 36 meters. A Natura 2000 site has been designated that covers the dunes, marshes and forests of the commune. Under this programme, Member States undertake to protect the habitats and species in the designated zones.

Origins of the town
The town of Le Touquet was given its full name by Hippolyte de Villemessant (1812–1879), founder and owner of the Paris newspaper Le Figaro. At the time it was an area of wild sand dunes and forest – part of a hunting estate. Its name came from a Picard word meaning "corner", and was originally applied to the area of coast, where the estuary of the Canche river forms a sharp angle when it meets the English Channel.

It became known as "Paris by the sea", and strict building regulations encouraged architects to create imaginative and innovative developments.

In 1894 John Robinson Whitley and Allen Stoneham bought a stretch of coastal land, through their company Le Touquet Syndicate Ltd, and developed the town into a golf and gambling resort.

Resort and the wealthy British

From the outset, Le Touquet proved to be an attractive resort destination for affluent British travelers. In 1909, H. G. Wells and Amber Reeves fled to Le Touquet in an abortive elopement. The two returned to Britain after a number of weeks and Reeves later gave birth to Wells's daughter, Anna-Jane Blanco White, after the relationship ended.

In the 1920s, Noël Coward and the "smart set" from England spent weekends there, and commissioned more outstanding villa designs echoing traditional and ultra-modern domestic styles. The architecture was both eclectic and playful, integrating numerous influences (e.g. anglo-normand, picard and expressionist).:46 Today the town tourism office offers guided tours to see outstanding examples of 19th- and 20th-century domestic architecture, which are now preserved and protected.

Sayaji Rao III Gaekwar of Baroda also owned a house here.

P. G. Wodehouse lived in Le Touquet from 1934 to 1940 until he was interned by the German army.

World War I 

Le Touquet sheltered thousands of refugees from other parts of northern France and from Belgium during World War I. The municipal services of Ypres and of Dixmude took up residence there during the hostilities. In total, Le Touquet received 6,000 Belgian citizens during the war.

The neighboring commune of Étaples was the site of a military base that functioned as an important staging area and training ground for British troops being moved into combat zones. It housed some 60,000 soldiers at any given time, making it the largest military camp in Europe during the conflict. About 2 million soldiers passed through it during the war. It was notorious for its extreme lack of comfort, unsanitary conditions and its poorly designed military training programme. In 1917, the  base  was the scene of an uprising — the Étaples mutiny. While the British officers were comfortably billeted in Le Touquet, the city was out of bounds for the common soldier. The uprising occurred when a New Zealand soldier was arrested when trying to return from Le Touquet to Étaples after sneaking across the Canches river at low tide. A crowd gathered to support the arrested soldier, and during tensions with the military police, another soldier was shot and killed, leading to further conflict. The uprising was ultimately suppressed and military sanctions included an execution and prison sentences.

The Casino, completed in 1913, was converted into a military hospital for wounded British troops — the Duchess of Westminster's (No. 1 British Red Cross Society) Hospital.  The No. 2 Canadian Stationary Hospital had the distinction of being the first Canadian Unit to land on French soil during the conflict. No. 2 Stationary opened at the Hotel du Golf at Le Touquet on November 27, 1914. Other hotels were also converted into military hospitals.

All of the 142 British Commonwealth war graves in Le Touquet's Communal Cemetery are from the hospitals. The graves occupy a plot by the cemetery entrance. The cemetery also contains French and Italian war graves. In the same cemetery a wooden obelisk was erected by the commune's lifeboatmen in honour of the British war dead.

World War II 

From end-May1940 to 1944, more than 40,000 German soldiers occupied the town.

In 1941, the Organisation Todt, the German army’s engineering corp, set up operations in Le Touquet, with the primary objective of building the Atlantic Wall in the region. Several bunkers are still clearly visible in the adjacent area.

In 1943, the Organisation Todt also demolished the prestigious Atlantic Hotel. Valuable construction materials from the demolition were sent to Germany in train cars marked as bearing “gifts from the French for their German friends.” Other hotels and homes were requisitioned to house German officers and troops.The Atlantic Wall was completed in 1943 and the first Allied bombs hit Le Touquet on October 2, 1943. The children of Le Touquet were evacuated from the city in February 1944; they took refuge in the safer region of Mayenne. In the first days of June 1944, two sets of diversionary bombings (whose purpose was to hide the true target of the D-Day landing) were unleashed on Le Touquet by the Allied forces, causing immense damage and many deaths.

Le Touquet was liberated by Canadian armed forces on September 4, 1944. A total of 106,745 mines were identified in and around Le Touquet, making it the most mined city in France. The position of the mines was as follows:  38,620 mines were found in the city itself; 54,125 in the dunes, race track and aérodrome;  13,800 under houses; and 200 in the municipal swimming pool. German prisoners of war participated in the process of identifying and removing the mines, as did French personnel. At Le Touquet, 78 démineurs died during this operation.:108-126

Post-WW II reconstruction 

The Second World War left its mark on the urban landscape of Le Touquet — it destroyed much of the city, particularly on the seafront. Although badly damaged, the pre-War villas were, for the most part, rebuilt. But in response to market pressures, these relatively small structures were replaced by high-rise buildings offering numerous apartments with sea views. In 1961, the first large scale residence, consisting of nine stories and 20 apartments, was built. Numerous other high-rise constructions followed.

This style of development has been criticised. For example, in 1999, the report of the classification commission for the natural site of the Pointe du Touquet stated: "The disappointing aspect of the latest developments on the seafront, both in their design and in their execution, illustrates what should be avoided from now on." The resort has since undertaken to preserve the quality of its built environment by regulating the construction of high buildings, providing norms for the renovation of existing buildings of architectural interest and promoting high quality modern architecture.

Population

Sport

Motorsport
Every year in February, an off-road motorcycle and quad beach race called  (formerly Enduro du Touquet) is held along the beach and through the dunes, with some 1,000 motorbikes, Quad bikes and 250,000 spectators.

Cycling

Le Touquet has been host to four stages of the Tour de France. The resort first hosted a stage during the 1971 Tour de France, as the finish for Stage 6b, from Amiens, on 2 July. Following this, the resort hosted Stage 3 of the 1976 Tour de France, on 27 June. This was a  individual time trial which both started and finished at the resort. The following day, Le Touquet was the departure point for the fourth stage, to Bornem in Belgium. The 2014 Tour de France began Stage 4 at Le Touquet on 8 July, with the stage taking a  route to Lille Métropole.

Tennis
The Le Touquet Tennis Club is the home of international tournaments. It has 33 courts (25 clay courts and 8 indoor courts), 2 club-houses, 1 central court with 900 places, 2 paddle-tennis courts and  4 mini tennis courts.

Climate
Le Touquet has an oceanic climate.

Miscellaneous
Inland from the beach, hotels, a casino and a horse racing course, a wide range of sports, particularly golf are offered. The Casino de la forêt provided the inspiration for the casino of Royale-les-Eaux in Casino Royale.

Notable people
 Le Touquet was the birthplace of Christian Ferras, violinist.
 P. G. Wodehouse lived at Le Touquet until the German occupation of France.
 Emmanuel Macron,  President of the Republic since 2017, votes in Le Touquet.

Twin towns
Le Touquet participates in international town twinning; its current partners are:
  Winterberg, Germany (since September 1966), winter sports town
  Rixensart, Belgium, south of Brussels
  Witney, Oxfordshire, United Kingdom
  Sidi Bou Said, Tunisia, upscale seaside town in the suburbs of Tunis
  Cary, North Carolina, United States
  Eckbolsheim, France,  from Strasbourg

Transportation
Le Touquet is served by Le Touquet - Côte d'Opale Airport. Le Touquet airport is a popular destination for British private pilots due to its geographical proximity to the UK, often becoming the first overseas flight destination.

Trains operated by SNCF operate to Étaples-Le Touquet in the adjacent town of Étaples. These operate from Paris Gare du Nord to Boulogne-Ville; from Boulogne-Ville to Arras (TER Hauts-de-France); from Lille Flandres to Calais-Ville (TER Hauts-de-France); and from Étaples-Le Touquet to Lille Europe (TERGV).

See also
Communes of the Pas-de-Calais department

References

External links

 Le Touquet town council website
 Photos of the market

 
Touquetparisplage
Seaside resorts in France
Pas-de-Calais communes articles needing translation from French Wikipedia